The 2021 Brentwood Borough Council election took place on 6 May 2021 to elect members of Brentwood Borough Council in England. This was on the same day as other local elections.

Results summary

Ward results

Brentwood North

Brentwood South

Brentwood West

Brizes & Doddinghurst

Hutton Central

Hutton North

Hutton South

Ingatestone, Fryerning & Mountnessing

Pilgrims Hatch

Shenfield

Tipps Cross

Warley

References

2021
Brentwood